Beuzeville-la-Grenier is a commune in the Seine-Maritime department in the Normandy region in northern France.

Geography
Junction 7 of the A29 autoroute forms the commune's southern border. Bréauté-Beuzeville station has rail connections to Rouen, Le Havre, Fécamp and Paris.

Heraldry

Population

Places of interest
 The church of St.Martin, dating from the eleventh century.
 A manorhouse and chateau of the 16th century.

See also
Communes of the Seine-Maritime department

References

Communes of Seine-Maritime